Archil Kiknadze (born 16 March 1915 in Chkheri, Kharagauli; died 27 June 1967 in Tbilisi), was a Georgian and Soviet football player and manager.

Career

As a player
Kiknadze, born in village Chkheri, Kharagauli, started his career in ZII Tbilisi of Georgian SSR and made his debut in the club's first team squad at the age of 19. Because of his good performances during the official matches of the regional tournament within the Soviet Union, when ZII Tbilisi won Georgian SSR Championship in 1936 — Aleksey Andreevich Sokolov (1904–1989) senior then coach of Dinamo Tbilisi noticed this young player and invited him to join the club's reserve team. He became a regular player in the first team by the 1937 season, playing 6 League and one Soviet Cup games for the club.

The following year, Kiknadze played 13 League matches from 25 and 5 Soviet Cup games. First success came in 1939. In that year he also played 13 League matches from 26 and won with the club his first domestic honour — Soviet Top League Silver medal.

Club career statistics

Source

Honours

Player

Club
 Dinamo Tbilisi
 Soviet Top League runner-up: 1939, 1940
 Soviet Top League bronze medalist: 1946, 1947
 Soviet Cup runner-up: 1946

References

External links
  Photo Archive at National Parliamentary Library of Georgia 
  Profile at Biographical Dictionary of Georgian Athletes
  Profile and Statistics at Dinamo-Tbilisi.ru
  Profile and Statistics at FootballFacts.ru
  Profile at Football99.ru

1915 births
1967 deaths
People from Kharagauli
People from Kutais Governorate
Soviet footballers
Association football defenders
Footballers from Georgia (country)
Soviet football managers
Soviet Top League players
FC Dinamo Tbilisi players
Honoured Masters of Sport of the USSR